Lineostriastiria is a genus of moths of the family Noctuidae.

Species
 Lineostriastiria biundulalis (Zeller, 1872)
 Lineostriastiria hachita (Barnes, 1904)
 Lineostriastiria hutsoni (J.B. Smith, 1907)
 Lineostriastiria olivalis (Barnes & McDunnough, 1916)
 Lineostriastiria sexseriata (Grote, 1881)

References
Natural History Museum Lepidoptera genus database

Stiriinae